Adriano Alves da Cruz (born 27 August 1974) is a retired Brazilian football defender.

References

1974 births
Living people
Brazilian footballers
Standard Liège players
K.V. Kortrijk players
R.E. Mouscron players
F.C. Marco players
Association football defenders
Belgian Pro League players
Brazilian expatriate footballers
Expatriate footballers in Belgium
Brazilian expatriate sportspeople in Belgium
Expatriate footballers in Portugal
Brazilian expatriate sportspeople in Portugal
Liga Portugal 2 players